Abram Halstead Ellis (May 21, 1847 – September 25, 1902) was a Justice of the Kansas Supreme Court from January 15, 1901 to September 25, 1902. He was the first justice of the Kansas Supreme Court to die while still a sitting member.

Early life
Ellis was born May 21, 1847 in Cayuga, New York, to Elmer Eugene and Jane Maria (née Halstead) Ellis. He moved with his parents to Eaton County, Michigan when he was still a child and received his education at the schools in Battle Creek.

Civil War service
At age 16, Ellis enlisted in the Union Army in 1864. He served as a private in Company C, 7th Michigan Cavalry until being discharged with the regiment in 1865.

Law career
Ellis was admitted to the Michigan Bar in 1872 and practiced there until 1878, when he moved to Beloit, Kansas. He continued to practice law and was active in Mitchell County politics as a Republican, serving as a delegate to the 1892 Republican National Convention in Minneapolis, which nominated President Benjamin Harrison for a second term.

When the Kansas Supreme Court was expanded by a state constitutional amendment in 1900, Ellis was appointed a Justice by Governor William E. Stanley.

Personal life
Ellis married Marian Josephine Prindle on May 30, 1872 in Chester, Michigan. Together they had two children: Ward (b. 1882) and Hale (b. 1890).

Death
Ellis died in Topeka, Kansas on September 25, 1902, and is buried Elmwood Cemetery in Beloit.

References

Justices of the Kansas Supreme Court
1847 births
1902 deaths
People from Cayuga County, New York
People from Battle Creek, Michigan
Union Army soldiers
People of Michigan in the American Civil War
Kansas Republicans
People from Beloit, Kansas
19th-century American judges